Patrick "Pat" Phelan is a video game audio composer, manager, and producer.

Background
At the age of 11, Phelan's parents bought him a VIC-20. He learnt how to program and began to write games. At age 13, he got his first synthesizer, a Korg MS20 and learning how to program the MS20's patch bay gave him his grounding in understanding the fundamentals of sound synthesis.

A few years later, the VIC was replaced with a Commodore 64. Soon there was a confluence between his gaming obsession and his love for sound and music. Influenced by Rob Hubbard and Ben Daglish, Phelan began to write music specifically for games. When he progressed to the Atari ST, Phelan began collecting keyboards and using the ST's built-in MIDI connectors, started to sequence complex arrangements, classical scores as well as audio for high-powered games.

In the early 1990s, Phelan joined Gremlin Graphics and was involved in the development of Zool. Later on, he took on other responsibilities and managed the audio department before eventually moving into more senior creative roles.

Phelan left to set up Full Circle where he provided audio solutions for games, music for TV, consultancy and games design services. His clients included Infogrames, Climax, Headfirst and The BBC.

Games developed
Some of the games Phelan helped develop include:
 Doctor Who: The Adventure Games
 Outrun Online Arcade
 Disney's A Christmas Carol
 New International Track & Field
 Driver 76
 Spooks
 Micro Machines
 Slam Tennis
 Alone in the Dark: The New Nightmare
 Shadow Fighter
 UEFA Challenge
 Motorhead
 N2O: Nitrous Oxide
 Soulbringer
 PGA European Tour
 Hardwar
 Top Gear 2
 Actua Soccer series
 Judge Dredd
 Actua Golf 2
 Realms of the Haunting
 Fightbox
 Normality
 Sand Warriors
 Loaded
 Actua Ice Hockey series
 Hogs of War
 Slipstream 5000
 Fatal Racing
 Utopia
 K240
 Fragile Allegiance
 Retribution
 Litil Divil
 Lotus series
 Zool
 Premier Manager series

Current status
Phelan joined Sumo Digital in 2005 he now works as an Audio Director.

Phelan, a member of TIGA (The Independent Game Developers Association) and Gamerepublic (an Independent Trade Alliance), lives in England.

External links
Patrick Phelan Developer BIO at Moby Games
Full Circle Audio
Artist profile at OverClocked ReMix
Reverbnation Page
 

Living people
Video game composers
Year of birth missing (living people)